Beach Picnic is a 1939 Donald Duck animated short film which was originally released on June 9, 1939, featuring Donald Duck and Pluto and produced by Walt Disney Productions in Technicolor and distributed by RKO Radio Pictures. This cartoon featured Donald and Pluto at the beach. It was the first cartoon in the Donald Duck series to feature Pluto (although he had previously appeared with Donald in Donald and Pluto).

Plot
Donald Duck is having a picnic at the beach, singing happily. After preparing the food, he tries to ride on an inflatable horse named Seabiscuit, but gets repeatedly bounced off of it, annoying him.

Donald then spots Pluto sleeping soundly on the shore, and decides to prank him by pushing Seabiscuit near him and mimicking a horse's whinnying. The mesmerized Pluto tries to chase Seabiscuit around some rocky reefs, but gets repeatedly frightened by the horse bumping him from behind.

Pluto then frantically tries to drown Seabiscuit into the water, to no avail. Getting angry, Pluto bites on the rubber horse's air valve  accidentally causing it to pop open, causing him to inflate like a balloon. As the rubber horse goes completely flat, Pluto is sent flying in the air and crashes into a shipwreck on the shore.

The scene cuts to an ant, who pokes its head out of the grass and looks around, until it spots Donald's food. It calls for the other ants to come and help steal the food. The ants swarm toward the picnic food and start carrying it away. Donald catches the ants and frantically chases them away. Donald angrily rants at the ants, and then notices some flypaper and decides to use it on the ants to get rid of them.

An ant secretly tries carrying away a piece of cake. Pluto spots the ant and curiously starts sniffing at it as it runs away. While Pluto follows the ant, Donald has finished setting up his flypaper trap, and sees the ant approaching. He puts down a flypaper, hoping for the ant to get stuck on it. The ant wisely crawls under it, but Pluto gets the flypaper stuck on his nose. After a long struggle, Pluto flies backward and bumps into Donald, causing the flypaper to get stuck on their bottoms.

Donald angrily rants at Pluto as they struggle to free themselves, until Pluto, having enough of Donald's ranting, runs around in circles, tossing Donald into his flypaper trap, causing his body to get wrapped in all of the flypapers like a mummy. As Donald angrily tries to free himself, Pluto runs over to him and starts licking him, ending the cartoon.

Cast
Clarence Nash as Donald Duck
Lee Millar as Pluto

Home media
The short was released on May 18, 2004 on Walt Disney Treasures: The Chronological Donald, Volume One: 1934-1941.

The short was also released on The Complete Pluto Volume 1.

Notes
The running gag of Pluto getting stuck in the flypaper from Playful Pluto is reused in this short. The other running gag of Pluto licking Donald from Donald and Pluto was also reused in this short. The relation of Donald and Pluto is unknown for they rarely get paired on screen.

References

External links
 
 
 

1930s color films
Donald Duck short films
1939 animated films
1939 short films
1930s Disney animated short films
Films directed by Clyde Geronimi
Films produced by Walt Disney
Films set on beaches
Animated films about dogs
Pluto (Disney) short films
RKO Pictures short films
RKO Pictures animated short films
1930s American films
Picnic films

simple:Beach Picnic (movie)